Kim Gi-hyeon (Korean: 김기현, born 21 February 1959) is a South Korean lawyer and politician served as the Mayor of Ulsan from 2014 to 2018. He was the acting President of the conservative People Power Party (PPP) from 30 April to 11 June 2021.

Career 
Kim Gi-hyeon was born in Sanha-ri, Gangdong-myeon, Ulju, South Gyeongsang (now Gangdong-dong, North District, Ulsan) in 1959. He is the 4th of 6 children of Kim Byung-geuk, the former Member of the South Gyeongsang Legislative Assembly from 1960 to 1961.

He attended to Busan East High School before studying law at Seoul National University. After qualifying for the bar in 1983, he worked in various non-governmental organisations i.e. Director of YMCA in Ulsan.

He was appointed the deputy spokesperson of the Grand National Party (GNP) in 2003. In 2004, he ran for South District 2nd constituency and was elected. He was re-elected in 2008 and 2012. On 12 April 2014, he contested Saenuri preselection for Ulsan mayorship and defeated Kang Ghil-boo. He resigned his parliamentary membership on 5 May in order to register his candidacy. On 4 June, he received 65.42% and defeated the Justice candidate Jo Seung-soo.

Following the election, Kim had showed his intention to run for the 2017 election, comparing an example of Bill Clinton, the former Governor of Arkansas who was elected the President of the United States. Following the political scandal in 2016, he was expected to leave his party, but confirmed to remain.

In 2018, Kim was again nominated the Ulsan Mayor candidate for the 2018 local elections. Initially, he led on some polls due to his high popularity. Nevertheless, he then came behind to the Democratic candidate Song Cheol-ho. On 13 June, he finally lost to the Democratic candidate.

On 29 January 2020, Kim launched his bid for the 2020 election. He contested UFP preselection for South District 2nd constituency and defeated Park Maeng-woo.

On 30 April 2021, Kim was elected the new parliamentary leader of the People Power Party (PPP), defeating Kim Tae-heum, Kweon Seong-dong and Yu Eui-dong. He also served as the acting party President until Lee Jun-seok was elected the new president on 11 June. He resigned as the parliamentary leader on 3 January 2022, but returned to the position 3 days later. On 29 March, he made his resignation without coming back to the position, in order to refurbish the party leadership.

Ideology 
His political position is described as centre. While as an MP, he was a member of centrist groups within the GNP. He is a pro-Lee Myung-bak. He is critical to welfare system.

Personal life 
He married Lee Sun-ae and has a son and a daughter.

Election results

General elections

Local elections

Mayor of Ulsan

References

External links 
 Kim Gi-hyeon on Twitter
 Kim Gi-hyeon on YouTube
 Kim Gi-hyeon on Blog

1959 births
Living people
20th-century South Korean lawyers
21st-century South Korean lawyers
Mayors of places in South Korea
Liberty Korea Party politicians
Seoul National University School of Law alumni
People from Ulsan
Members of the National Assembly (South Korea)
21st-century South Korean politicians
People Power Party (South Korea) politicians
South Korean judges